The Ohio Valley Conference baseball tournament is the conference baseball championship of the NCAA Division I Ohio Valley Conference.  The top six finishers in the regular season of the conference's ten teams advance to the double elimination tournament, most recently held in 2022 at Wild Health Field in Lexington, Kentucky.  The winner of the tournament receives an automatic berth to the NCAA Division I Baseball Championship.

Champions

By year
The following is a list of conference champions and sites listed by year.

By school
The following is a list of conference champions listed by school.

Italics indicate that the program no longer fields a baseball team in the Ohio Valley Conference, as of the next college baseball season in 2023.

References